João Pedro Junqueira Jesus (born 26 September 2001), known as João Pedro, is a Brazilian professional footballer who plays as a forward for  club Watford.

Early and personal life
João Pedro was born in Ribeirão Preto to parents Flavia Junqueira and José João de Jesus, more commonly known as Chicão, a professional footballer for Botafogo. Chicão was jailed for sixteen years in 2002, serving eight, for being an accessory to murder. By the time of Chicão's imprisonment, he and Junqueira had separated.

Career
João Pedro joined the youth system of Fluminense, and his mother moved with him to Rio de Janeiro. As he moved through the club's academy he switched from being a defensive midfielder, like his father, to an attacking midfielder, and then a striker. On 19 October 2018, before he had even made his senior debut, Premier League club Watford agreed a deal to sign João Pedro in January 2020 on a five-year contract. On 28 March 2019, João Pedro made his senior debut for Fluminense as a stoppage-time substitute in a 2–1 loss to arch-rivals Flamengo in the Campeonato Carioca. A month later on 29 April, he made his league debut as a late substitute in the 1–0 loss to Goiás. He then proceeded to fire seven goals in his next four games, including a hat trick in a 4–1 Copa Sudamericana victory against Atlético Nacional.

On 30 October 2019, it was announced that he had received his UK work permit and would sign for Watford in January 2020. He scored his first goal for Watford in a 1–0 win over Luton Town on 26 September 2020, his 19th birthday. He then scored a long-range goal on 16 October 2020 in Watford's win over Derby County. 

João Pedro scored his first Premier League goal against Manchester United on 20 November 2021. He dedicated the goal to his late stepfather, Carlos Junior. On 15 January 2022, João Pedro scored the equalizer against Newcastle United in the 88th minute. The match ended in a 1–1 draw.

Career statistics

References

External links

2001 births
Living people
People from Ribeirão Preto
Footballers from São Paulo (state)
Brazilian footballers
Association football forwards
Fluminense FC players
Watford F.C. players
Premier League players
English Football League players
Brazilian expatriate footballers
Expatriate footballers in England
Brazilian expatriate sportspeople in England